The 1965–66 Macedonian Republic League was the 23rd since its establishment. Rabotnički Skopje won  their 6th championship title.

Participating teams

Final table

External links
SportSport.ba
Football Federation of Macedonia 

Macedonian Football League seasons
Yugo
3